The island of Thimarafushi (Dhivehi: ތިމަރަފުށި), (pronounced "thi-ma-ra-fu-shi") is one of the inhabited islands of the Maldives.

Geography
The island is geographically located in the Thaa Atoll, which is also known as the Kolhumadulu Atoll.

Demography

The island has a recorded population of 4253 people as of July 2013.

Women
The number of women in the island is comparatively small compared to the population of males. The number of females under 18 years of age was 422. While the age group of 18-65 comprised 611 women, the elderly females numbered 46.  Therefore, the total population of females in the island is 1934.

Men
Statistical records as of June 2006 showed that the number of boys (aged below 18) was 520. The adult male population (18-65) was 745, and the male senior citizens (65+) were 64. Therefore, the male population of the island was 1,329.

According to the population chart shown here, the small island of Thimarafushi has a developing community's population structure.

Economy
Though the islanders of this beautiful island mainly depend upon the primary sector of the economic activities, they are also involved in the secondary and tertiary sectors. While fishing has become their main source of income, contract work, shipping and business have also taken their place in the economic activities of the island.

Services
The people of Thimarafushi collect rainwater for their daily consumption. There are 39 public rainwater tanks and 325 private rainwater tanks located in the island.

The sewerage system in the island is not connected to the sea, which lowers the chances of polluting the sea water surrounding the island. According to recorded statistics as of June 2006, the number of houses with toilets was 298. The number of houses with water pumps was 171.

Healthcare
According to the information as of April 2016, it was recorded that the island has one health centre, which is owned by the government, employing two doctors, eleven nurses, two community health workers, two family health workers, twenty administrative staff and one midwife. Thimarafushi also has two pharmacists and one public private pharmacy. The standards of western medicine are considered good in the island.

Sport
In Thimarafushi there is a youth centre which provides many indoor games, like table tennis, billiard, badminton, and futsal. It's not for school students after 6pm. There is a bashi court for women, and a volley court for males and females. and a new basketball court is to be opened.

Transportation
Thimarafushi has 164 bicycles, of which 162 are privately owned while the remaining two are owned by the government. One pick-up truck is also owned by the government, four motorcycles are privately owned, and two other vehicles are registered under private ownership.

As Maldives is famous for its surrounding sea and its bountiful treasures under water, Thimarafushi has its own sea transport vehicles. It owns two launches used for various purposes and nine mechanized dhoani used for fishing. No sailing dhoani, vadhu dhoani, bokkuraa nor sathari dhoani were recorded in the statistics sheets of the Maldives in June 2006. It has three other boats which travel between Malé and atolls.

In September 2013, built on reclaimed land, Thimarafushi Airport was opened in the island. The size of the island increased to  following this project, that also added a new neighborhood.

References

Islands of the Maldives